A powder tower, occasionally also powder house (Pulverhaus), was a building used by the military or by mining companies, frequently a tower, to store gunpowder or, later, explosives. They were common until the 20th century, but were increasingly succeeded by gunpowder magazines and ammunition depots. The explosion of a powder tower could be catastrophic as, for example, in the Delft Explosion of 1654. 

Buildings formerly used as powder towers include the following:
 Langer Turm, Aachen
 Pulvertürmchen in Aachen
 Pulverturm, Andernach
 Pulverturm, Anklam
 Pulverturm, Bad Bentheim
 Pulverturm, Bad Reichenhall
 Bremer Pulvertürme
 Pulverturm, Burghausen
 Malteserturm in Chur
 Knochenturm in Einbeck
 Pulverturm, Greiz
 Färberturm, Gunzenhausen
 Pulverturm, Hameln
 Pulverturm, Johanngeorgenstadt
 Pulverturm, Jena
 Pulverturm, Krems
 Pulverturm, Leutkirch im Allgäu
 Pulverturm, Lindau
 Pulverturm Lingen, Ems
 Pulverturm, Linz am Rhein
 Pulverturm, Mainz
 Pulverturm, Memmingen
 Pulverturm, Merano
 Pulverturm, Meschede
 Pulverturm, Munich
 Buddenturm in Münster
 Pulverturm, Ochsenfurt
 Pulverturm, Oldenburg
 Powder Tower, Otjimbingwe, Namibia
 Powder Tower, Prague (Prašná brána)
 Pulverturm, Quedlinburg
 Pulverturm, Rheinberg
 Powder Tower, Riga (Pulvertornis)
 Pulverturm, Schlanders
 Pulverturm, Straubing
 Pulverturm, Templin
 Pulverturm, Vellberg
 Pulverturm, Wiedenbrück
 Pulverturm, Zofingen
 Pulverturm in Zwickau
The Pulverturm, Demmin, bears the name, but was probably not used for this purpose.

Gallery

External links 

! 
Fortified towers by type